The Abilene Bombers were a professional indoor football team. The Bombers played their home games at the Taylor County Expo Center, in Abilene, Texas.

Team history
The Bombers began play as the Katy Ruff Riders, a 2007 expansion team of the Intense Football League. They originally played their home games at the Leonard E. Merrell Center in Katy, Texas. The Bombers relocated to Abilene, Texas at the conclusion of their 2008 Intense Football League season. From then on they were known as the Abilene Ruff Riders. On February 4, 2010, the Ruff Riders were purchased by a local ownership group. After the conclusion of their 2010 season, the team joined the Southern Indoor Football League. After the conclusion of their 2011 season, the team joined the Lone Star Football League. On April 17, 2012, the team changed its name and logo to the Abilene Bombers. They were later owned by BCPSA, LLC. In 2012, they joined the Lone Star Football League. They barely clinched a playoff spot with a 6–7 record, only to fall to the Amarillo Venom in the playoffs 70–40.

Final roster

2008 season schedule

2009 season schedule

Season-by-season

|-
| colspan="6" align="center" | Katy Ruff Riders (Intense)
|-
|2007 || 7 || 7 || 0 || 5th League || –
|-
|2008 || 5 || 9 || 0 || 7th League || –
|-
| colspan="6" align="center" | Abilene Ruff Riders (IFL)
|-
|2009 || 9 || 5 || 0 || 2nd Intense Lone Star || Lost Round 1 (San Angelo)
|-
|2010 || 2 || 12 || 0 || 3rd Intense Lone Star || –
|-
| colspan="6" align="center" | Abilene Ruff Riders (SIFL)
|-
|2011 || 4 || 8 || 0 || 4th WC Southwest || –
|-
| colspan="6" align="center" | Abilene Ruff Riders (LSFL)
|-
|2012 || 4 || 8 || 0 || 7th LSFL || –
|-
|2013 || 6 || 6 || 0 || 4th LSFL || Lost LSFL Semifinals (Amarillo)
|-
!Totals || 37 || 57 || 0
|colspan="2"|(including playoffs)

References

External links
 Abilene Bombers official website
 Taylor County Expo Center website
 Ruff Riders' 2007 stats
 Ruff Riders' 2008 stats
 Ruff Riders' 2011 stats

 
2007 establishments in Texas
2013 disestablishments in Texas